Portfolio Entertainment is a Canadian television production and film distribution company. It was founded in 1991 by Lisa Olfman and Joy Rosen with a focus on children's programming, later expanding into primetime and movie production. The company distributes television programming internationally to more than 90 countries, with about four-fifths of its catalogue being in-house productions.

Productions

Television shows and films

References

External links
 Official website

Television production companies of Canada
1991 establishments in Ontario
Companies based in Toronto